Septimus or Septimius may refer to:

Romans
People in Ancient Rome:
 Septimus (praenomen), a praenomen or Roman personal name
 Septimia gens, an ancient Roman family
 Lucius Septimius, one of the assassins of Pompey the Great (d. 48 BC). 
 Septimius Severus, Roman general and emperor from AD 193 to 211
 L. Septimius Bassianus, better known as Caracalla, the elder son of Septimius Severus, emperor from 198 to 217
 P. Septimius Geta, the younger son of Septimius Severus, emperor from 209 to 211
 Septimius (usurper), a usurper proclaimed emperor in 271 during the reign of Aurelian
 St Septimus (d. 303), martyred with SS Felix, Januarius, Fortunatus, and Audactus
 Septimius Acindynus, consul in 340
 Lucius Septimius (Roman governor), 4th century governor of Britannia Prima
 Q. Septimius Florens Tertullianus (c. 155– c. 240 AD), better known as Tertullian, theologian
 St Septimius of Iesi (died 307), bishop and saint

Palmyrenes
People from the Palmyrene Empire:
Septimius Odaenathus, first Palmyrene king (d. 267).
Septimius Antiochus, last Palmyrene emperor (re. 273).
Septimius Worod, Palmyrene viceroy (fl. 266).
Septimius Zabdas, commander of the Palmyrene armies (d. 272).

People with the given name
Septimus Aspinall (1907–1976), English rugby league footballer of the 1920s and 1930s
Septimus Atterbury (1880–1964), English football player
Septimus Francom (1882–1965), British long-distance runner
Septimus J. Hanna, American Civil War veteran and a judge in the Old West
Septimus Holmes Godson (1799–1877), British barrister
Septimus Kaikai, Sierra Leonean politician and broadcaster
Frederick Septimus Kelly (1881–1916), Australian rower, musician, composer
Septimus Kinneir (1871–1928), English cricketer
Sep Lambert, Septimus Drummond "Sep" Lambert, Irish cricketer
Septimus Norris, (1818–1862) American mechanical engineer and steam locomotive designer
Septimus Orion, a music recording project
Septimus Ridsdale (1840–1884), English first-class cricketer
Septimus Robinson (1710–1765), British Army officer
John Septimus Roe, first Surveyor-General of Western Australia
Septimus Rutherford (1907–1975), English footballer
Septimus Edwin Scott, (1879–1965) English painter
Septimus Winner, 19th-century songwriter
Septimus Warwick (1881–1953), British architect

Fictional people
Septim, a number of characters and entities in The Elder Scrolls game series
Septimus Bean and His Amazing Machine, a children's book
Septimus Heap, a series of books by Angie Sage, as well as the main character in the series
Septimus Warren Smith, a character in Virginia Woolf's novel Mrs Dalloway
Doctor Septimus Pretorius, a fictional character in the 1935 film Bride of Frankenstein
Septimus (Stardust), a fictional character in Neil Gaiman's novel Stardust
Septimus Hodge of Tom Stoppard's play Arcadia
Septimus Harding, the eponymous protagonist of Anthony Trollope's The Warden
Septimus Weasley, Ron Weasley's paternal grandfather in J.K. Rowling's Harry Potter series

Others
 Septimus (horse)
 
 Septimania, historical region in modern-day France